Lamma & Po Toi is one of the 10 constituencies in the Islands District in Hong Kong. It covers Lamma Island and Po Toi Islands.

The constituency returns one district councillor to the Islands District Council, with an election every four years.

Lamma and Po Toi constituency has an estimated population of 6,501.

Councillors represented

Election results

2010s

References

Lamma Island
Po Toi Islands
Constituencies of Hong Kong
Constituencies of Islands District Council
1982 establishments in Hong Kong
Constituencies established in 1982